Erie Railroad Signal Tower, Waldwick Yard is located in Waldwick, Bergen County, New Jersey, United States. The tower was built in 1886 and was added to the National Register of Historic Places on December 23, 1987.

Background

Constructed in 1848, the Paterson and Ramapo Railroad through Waldwick created a connection between the Erie Railroad at Suffern, New York to Paterson, where it linked with the Paterson and Hudson River Railroad to the terminal and ferry in Jersey City. A station at Waldwick was established in 1887. The yard around the depot was expanded in 1890.

The building was abandoned by NJ Transit in 1986.The Waldwick Historical Society refurbished it during the early 2000s and in 2016 they completed the project.

See also
National Register of Historic Places listings in Bergen County, New Jersey
 Timeline of Jersey City area railroads
 Newark Branch
 Bergen County Line

References

External links
 Pictures of Erie Railroad Signal Tower, Waldwick Yard
 Picture of Tower before being restored.
 View of Erie Railroad Signal Tower, Waldwick Yard via Google Street View

Queen Anne architecture in New Jersey
Transport infrastructure completed in 1886
Transportation buildings and structures in Bergen County, New Jersey
Erie Railroad
Railway signaling in the United States
Railway buildings and structures on the National Register of Historic Places
National Register of Historic Places in Bergen County, New Jersey
Waldwick, New Jersey
Signal boxes
New Jersey Register of Historic Places
Railway buildings and structures on the National Register of Historic Places in New Jersey
Industrial buildings and structures on the National Register of Historic Places in New Jersey